Moravia is a historical region in the Czech Republic.

Moravia may also refer to:
 Great Moravia, a European state in the 9th century
 The Latin name for Moray, a county in Scotland
 Margraviate of Moravia, a Mark in the Holy Roman Empire
 Moravia, Baltimore, Maryland, United States, a neighborhood in northeast Baltimore
 Moravia, Iowa, United States, a small city
 Moravia, New York, United States, a town
 Moravia (village), New York, within the town
 Moravia (canton), Costa Rica
 The former name of the Finnish melodic death metal band Tracedawn

People  
 Alberto Moravia, pen name of Italian writer Alberto Pincherle (1907-1990) who authored The Conformist
 Charles Moravia (1875-1938), Haitian poet, dramatist, teacher, and diplomat
 Freskin, Flemish nobleman, styled de Moravia

See also 
 Moravian (disambiguation)
 Morava (disambiguation)